Herb and Dorothy is a 2008 documentary film by Megumi Sasaki. The film tells the story of two middle-class collectors of contemporary art, Herbert and Dorothy Vogel, and the enormous and valuable collection of conceptual art and minimalist art they amassed in spite of their relatively meager salaries as New York City civil servants. Many artists are interviewed in the film, including Christo, Chuck Close, Robert Mangold, and Pat Steir.

, the film had made $194,721 at the box office.

Awards
2008 Audience Award for Best Documentary, Hamptons International Film Festival
2008 Golden Starfish Documentary Feature Award, Hamptons International Film Festival
2008 Audience Award, Silverdocs Documentary Festival
2008 Audience Award  for Best Documentary, Philadelphia Film Festival
2009 HBO Audience Award, Best Documentary, Provincetown International Film Festival

References

External links
 
 
 Herb and Dorothy site for Independent Lens on PBS

2008 films
American documentary films
Documentary films about the visual arts
Documentary films about New York City
2000s English-language films
2000s American films